A. imbricata may refer to:

 Anathallis imbricata, an orchid species
 Araucaria imbricata, a synonym for Araucaria araucana, the monkey-puzzle, a conifer species native to south-central Chile and west central Argentina
 Arctostaphylos imbricata, the San Bruno Mountain manzanita, a plant species endemic to San Mateo County, California

See also 

 Imbricata